Sir Francis Dillon Bell  (8 October 1822 – 15 July 1898) was a New Zealand politician of the late 19th century. He served as New Zealand's third Minister of Finance (the first parliamentary finance minister), and later as its third Speaker of the House. The town of Bell Block near New Plymouth – on land Bell bought from the Puketapu iwi in 1849 – is named after him, as is Bell Street, Whanganui. Bell's son, Francis Henry Dillon Bell, became the first New Zealand born Prime Minister in 1925.

Early life
Bell is believed to have been born in Bordeaux, France, where his father, Edward Bell, was a merchant and the British consul. His mother was Frances Matthews, daughter of Reverend J. Matthews. He grew up speaking both English and French fluently. When his family ran into financial problems, his father's cousin, Edward Gibbon Wakefield, managed to secure Bell a position as a clerk in the New Zealand Company's head office in London. As a result of office politics, however, it eventually became expedient for Bell to go to New Zealand in person, acting as an agent for the company.

New Zealand Company
Bell arrived in New Zealand in 1843. He moved around New Zealand considerably, visiting Auckland, Nelson, and the Wairarapa before finally becoming the New Zealand Company's resident agent in New Plymouth. While there, he successfully negotiated land deals with local Māori.

Later, following the resignation of William Fox as the company's agent in Nelson, Bell was appointed to this position. Passing through Wellington on his way to take up the post, however, Bell found the company's director in New Zealand, William Wakefield, to be in ill health. Bell postponed his journey to Nelson in order to help manage the company's affairs, and Wakefield consequently recommended Bell as his successor before he died. In the end, however, Bell was outmanoeuvred by William Fox, who Bell was replacing as the company's agent in Nelson.

Bell was very bitter at Fox's victory, and it was possibly as a result of this bitterness that Bell became a strong supporter of Fox's enemy, Governor George Grey. Grey appointed Bell to the Legislative Council of the New Munster Province. Bell's reputation suffered considerably from his association with the Governor, however, and many thought of him as a time-server and a sycophant. Bell eventually returned to his company post in Nelson, although the New Zealand Company did not survive long after Wakefield's death.

Political career

In 1851, Grey appointed Bell to the Legislative Council. When the Legislative Council was reformed, becoming merely the upper house of the new General Assembly (now called Parliament), Bell's appointment was reconfirmed. In 1854, the Legislative Council demanded that one of its members should be appointed to Fitzgerald's Executive Council (roughly corresponding to Cabinet). Bell was selected to join the four members of the lower house who had already been appointed, and took his place on 30 June. On 11 July, however, he was forced to resign due to the ill health of his wife.

He joined the Wellington Provincial Council for the Wairarapa and Hawkes Bay electorate and served from November 1853 to February 1856. He was a member of the Wellington Executive Council from 16 March 1854; the source does not state his end date.

In the 1855 election, Bell stood for the lower house in the Hutt electorate, and was successful. When Henry Sewell became New Zealand's first Premier and formed the Sewell Ministry, Bell was appointed Colonial Treasurer on 7 May 1856 (the office from which the modern post of Minister of Finance is descended). Sewell's premiership lasted only two weeks, however, and Bell lost his position. He resigned from Parliament on 10 October 1856 and moved to Otago.

Bell contested a 17 May 1858 by-election against Charles Brown in the Grey and Bell electorate. Brown and Bell received 75 and 61 votes, respectively. Brown was thus declared elected.

In 1859, he contested a supplementary election for the new electorate of Wallace, and was elected on 30 November. He was re-elected in the 1860 election, and elected as MP for Mataura in the following two elections. As an MP, he was highly active in campaigning for Southland to become an independent province, a goal which came to fruition on 1 April 1861.

He also joined the Otago Provincial Council and represented the electorates of Matau (1865–1867), Dunedin (1869–1870), and Otaramika (1871–1873).

When Alfred Domett became Premier in 1862, Bell became Colonial Treasurer once again, and also Minister of Native Affairs. Bell was relatively experienced in negotiating with Māori, and spoke the Māori language fluently. Bell was not particularly active in his Native Affairs role, however, as he believed that the Governor – not Parliament – should have primary responsibility for Māori relations. When Domett was ousted as Premier by William Fox, Bell lost both roles. From 1869 to 1871, Bell was a minister without portfolio.

After the 1871 election, Bell was appointed Speaker of the House. He is generally regarded to have been a competent speaker, having few strong views that might have biased him. He was knighted in 1873.

Later life
Although Bell initially intended to contest the 1875 election, he later decided to withdraw, expecting an appointment to the Legislative Council. A new government policy meant that this did not eventuate until 1877, however.

The commission's hearings, which had been prompted by friction between the Government and Te Whiti over plans to survey and sell previously confiscated land in central and south Taranaki, were closely connected with events at Parihaka, a settlement that became the centre of a passive resistance campaign against European encroachment on Māori land.

In 1880, Bell was offered a position as Agent-General in London. He served there until 1891. In London, Bell was involved in a large number of activities to promote New Zealand's interests, including discussions with the French regarding their territories in the Pacific – his fluency in French was a considerable asset in this regard.

As Agent-General in London he was New Zealand's senior representative at the World's Fair and exhibition at Paris in 1889 which showcased our agricultural and natural resources.  For his role at the exhibition, Sir Francis Dillon Bell was decorated with the Commandeur of the Légion d'honneur by the French Government in November 1889. He had previously been was awarded the KCMG in 1881 and a CB in 1886.

Apart from one brief visit in 1891, Bell did not return to New Zealand until 1896, when he retired to a farm in Otago. He died on his Shag Valley homestead in 1898.

Family
He married Margaret Hort in 1849. Her father Abraham Hort was a leading member of the Wellington Jewish community, but she became an ardent Christian. Their son, Francis Henry Dillon Bell became the first New Zealand born Prime Minister of New Zealand. Their fifth son, Arthur Bell, was active as an engineer in New Zealand and Western Australia.

List of honours
  KCMG
  Companion of the Order of the Bath
  Commandeur de la Légion d'honneur (France)

Notes

Biography in the 1966 Encyclopaedia of New Zealand

References

|-

|-

|-

1822 births
1898 deaths
New Zealand finance ministers
New Zealand MPs for Hutt Valley electorates
New Zealand MPs for South Island electorates
Members of the Cabinet of New Zealand
Members of the Wellington Provincial Council
Members of the Otago Provincial Council
Commandeurs of the Légion d'honneur
New Zealand recipients of the Légion d'honneur
English emigrants to New Zealand
Members of the New Zealand House of Representatives
New Zealand Knights Commander of the Order of St Michael and St George
New Zealand Companions of the Order of the Bath
Members of the New Zealand Legislative Council
Burials at Karori Cemetery
Members of the New Zealand Legislative Council (1841–1853)
High Commissioners of New Zealand to the United Kingdom
New Zealand politicians awarded knighthoods
New Zealand people of French descent
Parents of prime ministers of New Zealand
Dillon